Andrés "Andy" de la Cruz (born 1924, date of death unknown) was a Filipino basketball player who competed in the 1948 Summer Olympics.

References

External links
 

1924 births
Year of death missing
Olympic basketball players of the Philippines
Basketball players at the 1948 Summer Olympics
Asian Games medalists in basketball
Basketball players at the 1951 Asian Games
Philippines men's national basketball team players
Filipino men's basketball players
Asian Games gold medalists for the Philippines
Medalists at the 1951 Asian Games